Trichorrhexis can refer to:
 Trichorrhexis invaginata
 Trichorrhexis nodosa